This page describes all the 2005 seasons of Formula Renault series.

Formula Renault 3.5L

Formula Renault 2.0L

2005 Formula Renault 2.0 Eurocup season

2005 Championnat de France Formula Renault 2.0 season
Point system : 15, 12, 10, 8, 6, 5, 4, 3, 2, 1 for 10th. In each race 1 point for Fastest lap and 1 for Pole position.

2005 Formula Renault 2.0 UK season

2005 Formula Renault BARC FR2000 season

2005 Formula Renault BARC Club Class season

2005 Formula Renault 2.0 Italia season
Point system : 30, 24, 20, 16, 12, 10, 8, 6, 4, 2 for 10th. In each race 2 point for Fastest lap and 2 for Pole position.
Races : 2 or 3 races by rounds length of 30 minutes each.

2005 Formula Renault 2.0 Italia Winter Series
Point system : 20, 15, 12, 10, 8, 6, 4, 3, 2, 1 for 10th.

2005 Formula Renault 2.0 Germany season

2005 Formula Renault 2.0 Netherlands season
Point system: 20, 17, 15, 13, 11, 10, 9, 8, 7, 6, 5, 4, 3, 2, 1 for 15th. plus 1 point for pole position and 1 point for fastest lap in each race.

The following table is incomplete and show only the points results from each drivers.

2005 Formula Renault 2.0 Nordic Series season
Point system : 20. 1 point for pole position.

2005 Formule Renault 2.0 Suisse season
Point system: 25, 22, 20, 18, 16, 14, 12, 10, 8, 6, 5, 4, 3, 2, 1 for 15th. 1 point for fastest lap and 1 pont for pole position.

 Only the finish position in points are mentioned in the table due to lack of sources.

2005 Copa Corona Formula Renault 2000 de America season
Point system : 30, 24, 20, 16, 12, 10, 8, 6, 4, 2 for 10th. Extra 2 points for Fastest lap and 2 points for Pole position.
The series reward also the best rookie (N).

The June 12 round in the Autódromo de Aguascalientes was cancelled.

 (N) = Rookie championship

2005 Formula Renault 2.0 Brazil season
Point system : 30, 24, 20, 16, 12, 10, 8, 6, 4, 2 for 10th. 1 point for Pole position and 1 point for Fastest lap.

2005 Formula TR 2000 Pro Series season
The Formula TR 20000 Pro Series is held with the Formula TR 1600 Pro Series. The same point system is used.

2005 Asian Formula Renault Challenge season
Point system : 30, 24, 20, 17, 15, 13, 11, 9, 7, 5, 4, 3, 2, 1 for 14th. No points for fastest lap or pole position. Late drivers don't receive any points for the final standing. The team point attribution is different from the driver point system : 10, 8, 6, 5, 4, 3, 2, 1.
Races : 2 races by rounds.

 (1) = Rounds a and b doesn't award points.
 (2) = Final standing include only the best 10 results.
 (C) = China Formula Renault Challenge category.

Formula Renault 1.6L

2005 Championnat de France Formule Campus Renault Elf La Filière FFSA season
Point system : ?
All drivers use the La Fillière car. The championship is held on various French circuits:
1–2. Circuit Paul Armagnac (March 26–27)
3–4. ?
5–6. Circuit de Pau (May 7–8)
7–8. Dijon-Prenois (May 28–29)
9–10. Circuit du Val de Vienne (June 25–26)
11–12. Circuit Bugatti du Mans (July 9–10)
13–14. Circuit Bugatti du Mans (September 24–25)

2005 Formula Junior 1.6 Italia powered by Renault season
The season was held on 6 races in Italia.
Point system : 20, 17, 15, 13, 11, 10, 9, 8, 7, 6, 5, 4, 3, 2, 1 for 15th. Extra 1 point for Fastest lap and 2 points for Pole position.

2005 Formula Junior 1600 Italy Winter Series
Point system : 20, 17, 15, 13, 11, 10, 9, 8, 7, 6, 5, 4, 3, 2, 1 for 15th. Extra 1 point for Fastest lap and 2 points for Pole position.

2005 Formula Renault 1.6 Belgium season
Point system : ?

2005 Formula Renault 1.6 Argentina season
Point system : 20, 15, 12, 10, 8, 6, 4, 3, 2, 1 for 10th. 1 extra point for Pole position. 1 point for start in each race.

2005 Copa Corona Fórmula Renault Jr. 1600 season
The Copa Corona Formula 1600 Junior is held with the Formula Renault 2000 de America on the same races. The same point system is used.
Point system : 30, 24, 20, 16, 12, 10, 8, 6, 4, 2 for 10th. Extra 2 points for Fastest lap and 2 points for Pole position.

2005 Formula TR 1600 Pro Series season
The Formula TR 1600 Pro Series is held with the Formula TR 2000 Pro Series. The same point system is used.

Other Formulas powered by Renault championships

2005 GP2 Series season

The GP2 Series are powered by 4 liters, V8 Renault engine and Bridgestone tyres with a Dallara chassis.

References

Renault
Formula Renault seasons